Peter Alexander Cameron Macdonald OAM (born. 29 May 1943) is an Australian medical practitioner and politician from Glasgow, Scotland. He was formerly the independent member for the Electoral district of Manly in the New South Wales Legislative Assembly and Mayor of Manly Council.

Career
Born in Glasgow, Scotland, Macdonald was educated in Edinburgh, the University of London (MB, BS) and King's College Hospital. During this time, he was involved with the Royal College of General Practitioners (MRCGP) and joined the Royal College of Obstetricians and Gynaecologists, obtaining a Diploma in Anaesthetics (DA) and a Diploma in Obstetrics (DRCOG).

Macdonald emigrated to Australia in 1972. He settled in Manly and worked as a general practitioner from 1973 to 2006. He was elected to Manly Municipal Council from 1984 to 1999, becoming Deputy Mayor from 1995 to 1996. He was member for Manly from 1991 to 1999. In 2000 Macdonald founded and is the current President of Australian Doctors International, which provides non-government health care and development aid in remote and rural regions of Papua New Guinea.
He also worked with Médecins Sans Frontières in Iran in 1999, with Timor Aid in 2000 and was also Director of international community development organisation Plan International Australia from 2000 to 2003.

Macdonald resumed his local political career in 2004 when he was elected as Mayor of Manly, serving until 2008. He was re-elected as a councillor at the 2008 Local Government Elections following his announcement of not running for mayor and retired at the 2012 local government elections. In the 2011 Queen's Birthday Honours, Macdonald was presented with the Medal of the Order of Australia (OAM) "For service to local government, and to medicine."

References 

 

 

 

Living people
1943 births
Alumni of King's College London
Scottish emigrants to Australia
Mayors of Manly, New South Wales
Politicians from Sydney
Australian general practitioners
Independent members of the Parliament of New South Wales
Members of the New South Wales Legislative Assembly
Recipients of the Medal of the Order of Australia
People from Manly, New South Wales